The 2018–19 Lipscomb Bisons women's basketball team represents Lipscomb University in the 2018–19 NCAA Division I women's basketball season. The Bisons, led by seventh year head coach Greg Brown, play their home games at Allen Arena and were members of the Atlantic Sun Conference. They finished the season 4–25, 2–14 in America Sun play to finish in last place. They failed to qualify for the Atlantic Sun women's tournament.

On March 8, Greg Brown was fired after 7 seasons at his alma mater, in which the Bisons went 44–164 overall.

Media
All home games and conference road are shown on ESPN3 or A-Sun. TV. Non conference road games are typically available on the opponents website.

Roster

Schedule

|-
!colspan=9 style=| Exhibition

|-
!colspan=9 style=| Non-conference regular season

|-
!colspan=9 style=| Atlantic Sun regular season

See also
 2018–19 Lipscomb Bisons men's basketball team

References

Lipscomb
Lipscomb Bisons women's basketball seasons